Trapezitsa is a village and a community of the Voio municipality in Greece. Before the 2011 local government reform, it was part of the municipality of Neapoli, of which it was a municipal district. The 2011 census recorded 77 inhabitants in the village and 99 inhabitants in the community of Trapezitsa. The community of Trapezitsa covers an area of 10.275 km2.

Administrative division
The community of Trapezitsa consists of two separate settlements: 
Panareti (population 22)
Trapezitsa (population 77)
The aforementioned population figures are as of 2011.

See also
List of settlements in the Kozani regional unit

References

Populated places in Kozani (regional unit)